Nadesha Burlakova (born 17 February 1959) is a Soviet cross-country skier who competed from 1984 to 1986. At the 1984 Winter Olympics, she finished fourth in the 4 × 5 km relay, ninth in the 10 km, and 14th in the 5 km events.

Burlakova's best World Cup finish was fourth in a 5 km event in Finland in 1984.

Cross-country skiing results
All results are sourced from the International Ski Federation (FIS).

Olympic Games

World Cup

Season standings

Team podiums
 1 podium

References

External links

1959 births
Living people
Cross-country skiers at the 1984 Winter Olympics
Soviet female cross-country skiers
Olympic cross-country skiers of the Soviet Union